The Federation of Education Workers (FLC) is a trade union representing educators and researchers in Italy.

In 1996, the Italian General Confederation of Labour (CGIL) founded the Second Level Federation (School - University - Research - Training), which loosely grouped together the National Union of University and Research, and the National School Union.  In 2004, the two unions merged, forming the Federation of Education Workers, which also affiliated to CGIL.  By 2017, the union had 211,769 members.

General Secretaries
2004: Enrico Panini
2008: Domenico Pantaleo
2017: Francesco Sinopoli

References

External links

Education trade unions
Trade unions established in 2004
Trade unions in Italy